Summer in Mississippi is a 1965 Canadian documentary short from Beryl Fox, produced by the Canadian Broadcasting Corporation and first shown on This Hour Has Seven Days.

Synopsis
Director/producer Beryl Fox traveled to Mississippi after the bodies of the three civil rights workers working for the Freedom Summer project were found in August 1964. This cinéma-vérité documentary was made for the popular television news magazine program This Hour Has Seven Days.

Awards
Canadian Film Award – TV Information

See also
 Civil rights movement in popular culture

References

External links
Summer in Mississippi at CBC

1964 in Mississippi
1965 television films
1965 films
Canadian documentary television films
Canadian short documentary films
Documentary films about the civil rights movement
Films directed by Beryl Fox
Films set in Mississippi
Films shot in Mississippi
Civil rights movement in television
1960s Canadian films